Pushpalal Highway (H18) (Puṣpalāl Lōkamārg (Rā.18)) is an ongoing road project in Nepal, which is thought to be  long. After completion, it will be the longest national highway of Nepal. Nepal has three geographical regions from east to west, plain land or Terai in south, higher mountains or Himalayas in north and hills in middle region. The highway runs through the mid-hills region only. It starts from easternmost hill at Chiyo Bhanjyang of Panchthar District (Province No. 1) and ends at westernmost hill at Jhulaghat of Baitadi District in far west (Sudurpashchim Province).

See also
Madan Bhandari Inner Terai Highway
Mahendra Highway

References

Highways in Nepal
National Pride Projects